Jonathan Campbell (born September 24, 1991) is an American soccer player who plays as a defender for V.League 1 club Hồ Chí Minh City .

Biography

Early life and education
Campbell grew up in Johnson City, Tennessee. His grandmother and father are major influences in his life. His father owns a well-known music store in Johnson City, "Campbell's Morrell Music".

While playing a variety of sports throughout his childhood, Campbell developed a love and passion for soccer.

College and amateur soccer

Campbell attended Science Hill High School. His youth career was spent with East Tennessee Soccer Federation (ETSF) and FC Alliance between 1999 and 2009 before going on to play four years of college soccer at East Tennessee State University (ETSU). Campbell won three state titles with his Tennessee club team FC Alliance in 2006, 2007 and 2008.

At the age of 19, Campbell won his first Atlantic Sun Conference Championship in 2010 with ETSU. In his last season, ETSU won the Atlantic Sun Conference championship again, but were eliminated in the first round of the NCAA Tournament in 2013. Campbell, finished the season with one goal and five assists as a defender.

While trying to fit into the professional world and pursue his dream of playing soccer for a living, during his college years Campbell had the opportunity to play in the Premier Development League (PDL) for IMG Academy Bradenton in 2012 and 2013. He most recently played in the United States for the FC Miami City in 2016.

Professional career

After his senior season with ETSU in 2013, Campbell started playing for the Philadelphia Fury, who compete in the American Soccer League (ASL). In 2014, he signed his first professional contract and made his debut in September with the Fury.

After a great half season with Philadelphia Fury, Campbell decided to pursue a move into the United Soccer League (USL) in 2015. He started the year in preseason training with Seattle Sounders FC 2 (S2), but later in the year signed a contract with Charlotte Independence.

After 2015, Campbell returned to the Premier Development League for a season with the FC Miami City in 2016. After the season, he decided to pursue soccer overseas in Asia. He joined Chachoengsao FC in 2017 where he played in over 26 matches, scoring 2 goals, as a central defender for the Thai League 3 club.

In 2018, Campbell signed for Phnom Penh Crown where he plays in the Cambodian League, the highest football division in Cambodia. He scored his first goal in an international friendly against Malaysia Super League side Terengganu on January 9, 2018.

In 2019, Campbell joined PKR Svay Rieng which clinched the title of the 2019 Metfone Cambodian League. The team recorded a 25 games unbeaten in the league, which is a new record in Cambodian football.

He attracted interest from Philippines Football League side United City who signed him in early 2021 after his performance during United City (then known as Ceres-Negros at that time) match against Svay Rieng in the 2020 AFC Cup.

References

External links
 Jonny Campbell Interview
 Soccer takes Campbell to Thailand

1991 births
Living people
American expatriate soccer players
American soccer players
Association football defenders
Charlotte Independence players
Expatriate footballers in Cambodia
Expatriate footballers in Thailand
FC Miami City players
People from Johnson City, Tennessee
Phnom Penh Crown FC players
Soccer players from Tennessee
USL League Two players
Philadelphia Fury players
Expatriate footballers in the Philippines
American expatriates in Cambodia
American expatriate sportspeople in Thailand
American expatriate sportspeople in the Philippines
East Tennessee State Buccaneers men's soccer players